Ginásio Gilberto Cardoso or Ginásio do Maracanãzinho, sometimes called just Maracanãzinho ("Little Maracanã" or "Mini Maracanã"), is an indoor arena located in Maracanã in the north zone of Rio de Janeiro, Brazil. It is used mostly for volleyball. Its formal name, Ginásio Gilberto Cardoso, honors a former Clube de Regatas do Flamengo president. The capacity of the arena is 11,800 and it was opened in 1954. It stands next to the Maracanã Stadium.

History
Maracanãzinho's construction started on April 13, 1954 and lasted for only five months. It was built by Construtora Prolar S.A. The architects were Rafael Galvão, Pedro Paulo Bernardes Bastos, Orlando Azevedo and Antônio Dias Carneiro, the engineer was Joaquim Cardoso.

The gymnasium was inaugurated on September 24, 1954, with that year's Men's Basketball World Championship, for which it had a capacity for 25,000 spectators. The arena also hosted the 1963 event of the same competition, with the home team, coached by Kanela taking the gold medal, its second Men's Basketball World Championship in a row.

During the 1950s and the 1960s, the Miss Guanabara and Miss Brasil beauty pageants were held in Maracanãzinho.

During the 1960s and the 1970s several national and international music festivals were held in the gymnasium.

The 1960 and 1990 Men's Volleyball World Championship was held in Maracanãzinho.

At the age of 32, Simone Bittencourt de Oliveira became the first female singer to fill the Maracanãzinho Gymnasium in 1981.

The 2013 World Judo Championships was held in Maracanãzinho.

The Maracanãzinho Gymnasium hosted UFC 179 in October 2014 and UFC Fight Night: Maia vs. LaFlare in March 2015.

The Maracanãzinho Gymnasium hosted the volleyball competitions during the 2016 Summer Olympics.

In 2013, WWE.com claimed the arena was the site of the 1979 WWE Intercontinental Championship tournament, an April Fools' Day prank.

Renovations
For the 2007 Pan American Games, the gym was remodeled, with new central air conditioning, an added four-sided scoreboard, a new sound system, a dome which allows natural lighting during the day, new comfortable seating, and adaptions to all international requirements. As a result, the Maracanãzinho became a venue for the volleyball competitions of the 2007 Pan American Games, and many other international competitions. After the renovations, the capacity of the arena was reduced from  approximately 13,000 to 11,800 spectators for futsal. The arena became much more comfortable for spectators, as the field of vision was increased for better viewing of the arena floor.

Concerts
The arena has also hosted a number of important rock concerts, including, among others, the following list:

 Nat King Cole
 Jackson Five
 Legião Urbana 
 Engenheiros do Hawaii
 Earth, Wind & Fire  
 Genesis
 Alice Cooper
 The Cure
 New Order
 Deep Purple
 The Police
 Midnight Oil
 Peter Frampton
 Van Halen
 Megadeth
 Metallica
 Quiet Riot
 Secos & Molhados
 Skid Row
 Iron Maiden
 Information Society (band)
 Faith No More
 Motörhead
 Jethro Tull
 Venom

References

External links

 
Venue information

Sports venues completed in 1954
Indoor arenas in Brazil
Sports venues in Rio de Janeiro (city)
Venues of the 2016 Summer Olympics
Olympic volleyball venues
Volleyball venues in Brazil
Basketball venues in Brazil
Boxing venues in Brazil
Judo venues